Lawless Love is a lost 1918 silent film western drama directed by Robert Thornby and starring Jewel Carmen. It was produced and distributed by te Fox Film Corporation.

Cast
 Jewel Carmen as LaBelle Geraldine
 Henry Woodward as Black Jim
 Edward Hearn as Freddie Montgomery

References

External links
 
 

1918 films
1918 Western (genre) films
Lost American films
American black-and-white films
Films directed by Robert Thornby
Fox Film films
Silent American Western (genre) films
1910s American films